Midnight Bayou, also known as Nora Roberts' Midnight Bayou, is a 2009 made-for-TV movie directed by Ralph Hemecker, which stars Jerry O'Connell, Lauren Stamile, and Faye Dunaway. The film is based on the 2001 Nora Roberts novel of the same name and is part of the Nora Roberts 2009 movie collection, which also includes Northern Lights, High Noon, and Tribute. The film debuted on March 28, 2009, on Lifetime.

Plot
The film revolves around Harvard-educated lawyer Declan Fitzpatrick (O'Connell), who impulsively gives up his settled life to buy Manet Hall, a newly restored plantation manor near New Orleans, which he has always been drawn to.

Local legends claim that the house is haunted, and shortly after Declan moves in, he begins hearing voices and seeing things. Declan is also distracted by an undeniable attraction to Cajun local, Lena Simone. Lena was raised on the bayou by her grandmother Odette (Dunaway), and has her own deep connection with the manor.

While living in the house, Declan begins to have visions from a century past and details of events that took place in the mansion. With the help of Odette, Declan and Lena realize that they are inextricably linked with Manet Hall, and uncover a shocking secret that has been hidden there for more than 100 years.

Cast
 Jerry O'Connell as Declan Fitzpatrick
 Lauren Stamile as Lena Simone
 Faye Dunaway as Odette Simone
 Isabella Hofmann as Lilibeth Simone, Lena's mother
 Alan Ritchson as Lucian Manet
 Ashley LeConte Campbell as Josephine Manet
 Alejandro Rose-Garcia as Julian Manet
 Bianca Malinowski as Abigail Manet (as Bianca Malino)
Chris Lindsay as Remy
Ciera Payton as Effie

Production
The film was executive produced by Stephanie Germain and Peter Guber, who also 'e.p.-ed' seven other Roberts films for Lifetime in 2007 and 2009.

Filming locations
The "manor" scenes were filmed at Oak Alley Plantation in Vacherie, Louisiana. The major "city" scenes were in New Orleans, Louisiana.

References

External links

Official website

2009 television films
2009 films
2009 romantic drama films
American romantic drama films
Films based on American novels
Films about reincarnation
Films directed by Ralph Hemecker
Films set in New Orleans
Films shot in New Orleans
Lifetime (TV network) films
American thriller television films
Films with screenplays by Stephen Tolkin
American haunted house films
American drama television films
2000s American films